Arçay is a commune in the Cher department, Centre-Val de Loire, France.

Geography

Population

The inhabitants are called Arcéens or Arcéennes.

Places of interest
 The church of St.Sulpice, dating from the nineteenth century.
 The nineteenth-century château Belair.

See also
Communes of the Cher department

References

Communes of Cher (department)